Teresa Bernabé (born 29 August 1983 in Madrid, Spain), better known as Tibi & her cello, is a Spanish cellist and singer-songwriter who combines voice and cello.

Biography
Bernabé began playing cello when she was 9 years old, and graduated as a cello teacher from the Professional Conservatory of Music "Angel Arias Maceín" in Madrid. Afterward she studied Musical Education in Madrid until 2006, when she moved to the United Kingdom due to a grant from AIE ("Sociedad de Artistas Interpretes o Ejecutantes de España") to study at The Liverpool Institute for Performing Arts in Liverpool.

Career
Bernabé began her musical career in 2002 as a classical cellist, playing in orchestras in Madrid and France, until she decided to experiment in the world of modern music.  She began working with Spanish bands such as Zahara, Alex Ferreira, Georgina, Richter, Martin Page, and Emerge.

Since 2006, Bernabé has played for other bands such as China Crisis, and has also started her own solo project: "Tibi & her cello".

In 2008, Bernabé collaborated as a member of "Martin Page & The Polaroids", winning the Ecopop Festival Award 2008 where she shared the stage with artist Jorge González, percussionist of Vetusta Morla.

These days, she continues to collaborate with Zahara, China Crisis and Gary of the Crisis, and she is about to release her first EP Lost in the Sounds... as her own solo project.

Style
Bernabé's method of playing cello differs from the conventional classic forms of playing the instrument, using an innovative technique that lets her play and sing at the same time. Her songs incorporate a wide range of elements and instruments, obtaining a sound closest to psychedelic folk.

Discography

Studio albums
Kallisti : Emerge (2006) as singer and cellist
Patchwork : Richter (2007) as cellist
Manifesto : Large and Loose (LIPA, Steve Berry) (2007)

EPs
Un Domingo Cualquiera : Alex Ferreira (2007) as cellist

Compilation albums
Lost in the Sounds..., April 2010

References

External links
 Tibi & her cello at Myspace
 Tibi & her cello Biography at Last.FM

1983 births
Living people
Spanish cellists
Musicians from Madrid
Singers from Madrid
Alumni of the Liverpool Institute for Performing Arts
Women cellists
21st-century Spanish singers
21st-century Spanish women singers
21st-century cellists